Garcinia nigrolineata has been called "wild beaked Kandis" (from the Malay name – see below) and is a tree species in the family Clusiaceae.  The Catalogue of Life lists no subspecies.

Description and vernacular names
Garcinia nigrolineata is an Asian tropical forest under-storey tree some 10–14 m high;: well-illustrated in Trees of Tropical of Asia.  
Leaves are approx. 100 x 35 mm.  
Flowers have 3 mm petals with 25 stamens in a head.  
Fruits are orange when mature, approx. 30 mm: developing from a 5-7 celled ovary.

Names for this plant include:
 Indonesian: Kandis Keling
 Malay: Kandis Gajah, Kandis Jantan
  Chamuang
 Vietnamese – bứa lằn đen or bứa đen

References

See also 
Garcinia assamica

External links 
 

nigrolineata
Trees of Malaysia
Trees of Thailand
Trees of Vietnam
Flora of Indo-China